El Valle may refer to:

Places 
 El Valle, Choco, Colombia
 El Valle, Dominican Republic, a town in Hato Mayor province, Dominican Republic
 El Valle de Antón, a town in Cocle province, Panama
 El Valle de la Unión, a town in Colon province, Panama
 El Valle Golf Resort, a golf resort in Murcia, Spain
 El Valle, Granada, Spain
 El Valle (Carreño), Spain
 El Valle (Candamo), Spain
 El Valle, Nueva Esparta, Venezuela
 El Valle Parish, Caracas, Venezuela

Other 
 El Valle (volcano)

See also
 Valle (disambiguation)
 Del Valle (disambiguation)